The Volvo YCC ("Your Concept Car") was a concept car made by Volvo Cars presented at the 2004 Geneva Motor Show, with the stated goal of meeting the particular needs of female drivers. In order to do so, Volvo assembled a design team entirely made up of women, around October 2001. It was a major exercise in ergonomics from the perspective of a female driver.

Those who were involved during the several stages of the project were: Maria Widell Christiansen, Eva-Lisa Andersson, Elna Holmberg, Maria Uggla, Camilla Palmertz, Cynthia Charwick, Anna Rosén, Lena Ekelund, and Tatiana Butovitsch Temm.

On the outside the car looked, at first glance, like a mildly futuristic four-seat coupé. On closer inspection, one could see that there was no hood, that is, no access panel permitting access to the car's engine. Engine maintenance required taking out the whole front end of the car body, preferably in some establishment with the required space and equipment. This was not supposed to happen often, as the engine was designed to need an oil change only after  and to automatically send a radio message to a garage a short time before any required maintenance.

Filling the windshield washer tank was done by a capless ball valve, right next to the capless gas tank ball valve. Volvo surveys had found (among many other things) that female drivers considered caps to be a major nuisance. The car featured run-flat tires, like those of wheeled armoured vehicles, in order to be able to drive all the way to a garage after a puncture and thus avoid having to change a tire by the side of the road.

Entry into the car was by the means of two gull-wing doors on the sides. The concept was a three-door, four-seat coupe design. It also had an upwards-opening hatchback door giving access to the trunk and cargo area.

All three doors were motorized for a sensor-based “keyless” entry. Pressing on a single button on the keychain automatically opened the nearest door, making it easy for somebody holding bags of groceries or other sundries to get the things in the car without putting anything down. The interior was maximized for easy storage and good looks.

All of the textile panels or textile parts such as the seat pads or the door sides could be removed easily to change the color schemes and vary textures.

The headrests had indentations to accommodate pony tails. The shifting column and the hand brake were removed from the center console to give the front-seat passengers easier access to the large storage compartments located within the dashboard. The rear seat could fold up, making it easy for the driver to get a fairly big item in the car without opening the hatchback. The bumpers and body cladding were made from tough, dent-resistant materials. The hybrid engine was economical and powerful. The five-cylinder engine produced .

References

External links 

 The Volvo YCC (Your Concept Car) first birthday
 BBC News article

YCC
Cars introduced in 2004
Rear-wheel-drive vehicles
Coupés
Automobiles with gull-wing doors